Mackenzie Delta is a territorial electoral district for the Legislative Assembly of the Northwest Territories, Canada. The district consists of Aklavik, Fort McPherson and Tsiigehtchic.

History
The district was created when Mackenzie West was split into this district and Mackenzie River. In its first incarnation after redistribution in 1954 it covered the communities of Paulatuk, Stanton, Tuktoyaktuk, Reindeer Depot, Aklavik, Fort McPherson, Arctic Red River (Tsiigehtchic), Fort Good Hope and East Branch. The district was abolished for the first time in 1975 and recreated again in 1979.

Members of the Legislative Assembly (MLAs)

Election results

2019 election

2015 election

2011 election

2007 election

2003 election

1999 election

1995 election

1991 election

1987 election

1983 election

1979 election

1970 election

1967 election

1964 election

1960 election

1957 election

1954 election

Notes

References

External links 
Website of the Legislative Assembly of Northwest Territories

Northwest Territories territorial electoral districts